Sudhir (real name Shah Zaman Khan) was a Pakistani film actor, director and producer. He made his film debut in the 1947 movie Farz, and continued to work in Pakistani cinema through the 1980s. In the course of his career, he became known as an action hero, and appeared in a total of 173 films.

Filmography
Sudhir's films are shown below. Each decade (1950s, 1960s, 1970s) are listed separately.

1950s
Dopatta (1952)
Gumnam (1954) 
Sassi (1954) 
Toofan (1955)
Dulla Bhatti (1956)
Mahi Munda (1956)
Chhoti Begum (1956)
Baaghi (1956)
Guddi Guddi (1956)
Daata (1957)
Yakke Wali (1957)
Nooran (1957)
Anarkali (1958)
Aankh Ka Nasha
Jatti (1958)
Akhri Nishan (1958)
Kartar Singh
Jhoomer (1958)

1960s 
Ek thi Maa
Ajab Khan
Gul Bakawli
Ghalib
Baghawat
Kala Pani
Chacha Khamkhawa
Daachi
Mama Jee
Ghadaar
Farangi
Phanney Khan
Mann Mouji
Jeedar
Josh
Koh-e-Noor
Abba Jee
Jani Dushman
Medan
Mafroor
Chann Makhna
Pagri Sanbhal Jatta
Ek hi Rasta
Her fun Moula
Main zinda hun
Buzdil
Bhaian di jori
Waryam
Sheran de Puttar Sher

1970s 
Maa Puttar
Behram
Charhda Suraj
Sher Puttar
Yaar Badshah
Sajawal
Ghairat mera naa
Ishq bina ki jeena
Khoon Paseena
Heera Moti
Puttar da piar
Nizam
Thaah
Nishan
Bahadra
Lottery
Jadoo
Sir da badla

Soorat aur Seerat
Sultana Daku
Baaghi te Farangi
Ann Daata
Do Chor
Dushan ki talash
General Bakht Khan
Khan -E- Azam

1980s 
Khan-e-Azam (1981)
Maidan
Zalzala
Son of Ann Daata

Roles with other famous actors
Sudhir starred in the majority of Pakistani films made during the 1950s, 1960s and 1980s, and worked with several other Pakistani movie stars, including: 
Mazhar Shah (21 films)
Allauddin (21)
Talish (17)
Habib (12)
Iqbal Hassan (11)
Muhammad Ali (10)
Sultan Rahi (10)
Sawan (9)
 Ilyas Kashmiri (9)
Asad Bukhari (8)
Adeeb (5)
Shahid (5)
Akmal (4)
Yusuf Khan (4)
Inayat Hussain Bhatti (3)
Waheed Murad (3)
Ejaz Durrani (3)

Sudhir worked with actresses including Asha Posley, Rehana, Husna, Jameela Razzaq, Bahar  Deeba, Ghazala, Roohi Bano and Naheed, as well as the following:
Firdous (28 films)
Neeli (23)
Naghma (22)
Sabiha Khanum (14)
Musarrat Nazir (12)
Saloni (7)
Asiya (6)
Zeba (6)
Rani (5)
Noor Jehan (4)
Rukhsana (3)
Rozina (3)
Musarrat Shaheen (3)
Gulshan Ara (2)
Meena Shorey (2)
Nayyar Sultana (2)
Laila (2)
Aliya (2)
Najma (2)
Shamim Ara (2)

Directorial roles
He directed two films: 
Sahil (1960)
Baghawat (1963)

Super-Hit Film Songs
Though he did not commonly sing in his films, songs which he sang that became hits included: 
Aaj yeh kis ko nazar ke samne pata hun main...
(Fazal Hussain - Toofan 1954)
Jhootiye jehan diye, kachiye zaban diye...
(Inayat Hussain Bhatti - Mahi Munda 1956)
Panchhi te Perdeshi, pyar jadun vi pande...
(Munir Hussain - Nooran 1957)
Ik Berhi wich do sawar, Ik Perdeshi ik Mutiyar
(Munir Hussain - Nooran 1957)
Kar sari khataen muaaf meri, tere darr peh main aan gira
(Salim Raza - Daata 1957)

(Inayat Hussain Bhatti - Kartar Singh 1957)

(Masood Rana - Daachi 1964)

(Masood Rana - Pind di Kurri - 1968)

(Masood Rana - Weryam 1969)
Ik Parri, harri bharri...
(Ahmad Rushdi - Soorat aur Seerat 1975)

References

External links
Sudhir Filmography with Online Movies, Retrieved 22 Dec 2015

Sudhir